Negin Zandi Dareh Gharibi (born 20 January 2004) is an Iranian footballer who plays as a forward for Kowsar Women Football League club Bam Khatoon FC and the Iran national team.

International career 
She scored 1 goal in 4 national team caps.

International goals

References 

2004 births
Living people
Iranian women's footballers
Iran women's international footballers
Women's association football forwards
People from Izeh
Iranian expatriate  footballers
Sportspeople from Khuzestan province
21st-century Iranian women